Ephysteris olympica is a moth in the family Gelechiidae. It was described by Povolný in 1968. It is found in southern France (the Pyrenees and western Alps) and Greece.

References

Ephysteris
Moths described in 1968